Patrick Greaney (fl. 18th century) was a Gaelic-Irish poet.

Greaney was a poet from Ballintleva, Tuam, and worked for Ulick Jennings of Ironpool in the parish of Kilconly, who was a member of the local gentry. Ulick's son was John Jennings. Along with a composition called Seán Óg Ó Ciardhubháin, Greaney's lament for John Jennings' unexpected death, Doctúir Jennings, was among his most notable songs.

All of Greaney's known works were collected and published by Eibhlín Bean Ui Coisdealbha in 1919 in a compilation of traditional folk-songs from Galway and Mayo, titled Amhráin Muighe Seola.

Literature

 Amhráin Muighe Seola, Eibhlín Bean Ui Coisdealbha, 1919.
 A Local Poet, by Phil Carney-Moran, in Sylane National School 150th Anniversary, ed. John Lardner, Margaret Murray, Phil Moran, Tuam, 2002.

18th-century Irish-language poets
People from Tuam